FS Class E.321 was a class of 17 third-rail electric locomotives, built for the Italian State Railways (FS) for operation on the Varese line and on the underground line in Naples.

History
The E.321 was an evolution and improvement of the previous FS Class E.320. Seventeen units were built by Officine Meccaniche (OM) of Milan, with electrical equipment by Tecnomasio Italiano-Brown-Boveri (TIBB), from 1923 to haul heavy passenger trains on the electrified line of the Milan - Varese - Porto Ceresio railway and for use on the so-called "subway" of Naples.

Construction 
The locomotive consisted of a single central box, following the typical design of the time, with cabs and control desks at each end. This was mounted on a rigid frame carried on three coupled axles with  1,500 mm driving wheels and a carrying axle on the typical Italian Zara bogie at each end. The wheel arrangement was 1′C1′. The electrical equipment was contained in the central body.

The design was almost the same as the E.320, but addressed the fragility of the E.320's mechanical rod transmission. The two motors, of similar but slightly lower power rating, were now set lower in the frame. This allowed the previous arrangement of steeply inclined coupling rods to intermediate jackshafts to be replaced by a lighter triangular rod on each side, similar to that used on the Italian three-phase locomotives, and no longer needing the jackshafts. The total weight of the locomotive in working order was 69 tonnes, of which 48 tonnes was adhesive. This was nearly three tonnes lighter than the E.320 and yet there was nearly a ton more adhesive weight.

They were painted in the typical khaki brown Castano-Isabella livery of Italian electric locomotives.

Preservation
E.321.012 is preserved at the Museum of Science and Technology in Milan.

See also 
 FS Class E.321, a 3,000 V overhead line loco of 1957

References

Further reading

    Giovanni Cornolò, Locomotive elettriche FS, Parma, Ermanno Albertelli Editore, 1983, pp. 39–43.
    Stefano Garzaro, Locomotive elettriche FS,1986, editrice Elledi

650 V DC locomotives
1′C1′ locomotives
E.321 (third rail)
Railway locomotives introduced in 1923
TIBB locomotives
OM locomotives
Standard gauge locomotives of Italy
Shunting locomotives